Stephen Pearlman (February 26, 1935 – September 30, 1998) was an American theatre, film  and television actor, known for starring in the films Die Hard with a Vengeance and Pi. He also played Zampano in the Broadway musical La Strada.

Biography
Pearlman was born in Brooklyn but raised in Jersey City, New Jersey.  After graduating from Dartmouth College in 1954, Pearlman immediately become a theatre actor making his New York stage play debut in The Threepenny Opera in 1959. He has also acted in La Strada in 1969, in which he played one of the leading roles. He also appeared in many film and television roles such as Die Hard with a Vengeance, Seinfeld, Pi and Law and Order.

Death 
Pearlman died on September 30, 1998, in his Manhattan apartment. The reported cause of death was cancer.

Filmography

References

External links

American actors
1935 births
1998 deaths
People from Brooklyn
Deaths from cancer in New York (state)
Dartmouth College alumni
People from Manhattan
People from Jersey City, New Jersey